Greater Amsterdam School District is a school district headquartered in Amsterdam, New York.

Schools
 Amsterdam High School
 Barkley Elementary School
 Curie Institute School
 McNulty Academy School
 Tecler Elementary School
 Lynch Literacy Academy School

References

External links
 
School districts in New York (state)
Education in Montgomery County, New York